Anupgarh Assembly constituency is one of constituencies of Rajasthan Legislative Assembly in the Bikaner (Lok Sabha constituency).

Anupgarh Constituency covers all voters from Gharsana tehsil and part of Anupgarh tehsil, excluding ILRC Salempura and ILRC Banda Colony.

Members of the Legislative Assembly

See also 
Member of the Legislative Assembly (India)

References

Sri Ganganagar district
Assembly constituencies of Rajasthan